RAF Transport Command was a  Royal Air Force command  that controlled all transport aircraft of the RAF. It was established on 25 March 1943 by the renaming of the RAF Ferry Command, and was subsequently renamed RAF Air Support Command in 1967.

History

Second World War
During the Second World War, it at first ferried aircraft from factories to operational units and performed air transport.  Later it took over the job of dropping paratroops from Army Cooperation Command as well.  Transport Command was the only RAF command in to which aircrew originating in the Caribbean were not posted due to the fact that they might be required to fly to the United States where racial discrimination was legally entrenched at the time.

In June 1944 the Command was made up of No. 38 Group RAF; No. 44 Group RAF; No. 45 Group RAF; No. 46 Group RAF; No. 216 Group RAF; No. 229 Group RAF; No. 114 Wing RAF, and No. 116 Wing RAF at RAF Hendon.

No. 44 Group - HQ at Gloucester
 "In the early days of the North Atlantic route, there was ..at the eastern end ..the Overseas Air Movements Control Unit (OAMCU) which in August 1941 was up-rated to become No 44 Group, thus becoming the second piece of the Transport Command jigsaw. With its Headquarters at Barnwood (near RAF Innsworth) in Gloucester, [the group] organised the receipt of all aircraft arriving from across the Atlantic, as well as the despatch of those going out to the Mediterranean and the Far East; it also co-ordinated the massive influx of USAAF aircraft and crews under Operation Bolero." 
 Controlled airfields such as Bramcote (where 105 Operational Training Unit was located), Filton, Hendon, Hurn, Kemble, Llandow, Lyneham, Melton Mowbray, Pershore, Portreath, Prestwick, St Mawgan and Talbenny

No. 45 Group RAF - HQ at Dorval in Canada, (the former Atlantic Ferry Organization)
 No. 112 Wing at Dorval
 No. 113 Wing at Nassau

No. 46 Group RAF - HQ at Harrow Weald
 Controlled airfields such as Blakehill Farm
 Units included Nos 233, 512 575 Squadrons

No. 216 Group RAF HQ in Egypt

No. 229 Group RAF HQ at Delhi, India (formed 1943–44); controlled No. 177 Wing

No. 114 Wing RAF - HQ at Accra in the Gold Coast,
 Controlled airfields such as Heliopolis
 Units included No. 284 Wing

No. 116 Wing RAF at RAF Hendon, which supervised scheduled services to India.

On 17 February 1945 No. 87 Group RAF was formed in Paris to control units in Paris and southern France. It was disbanded by being reduced to No. 87 Wing RAF on 15 July 1946.

Accidents

Operating as it did under wartime conditions, Transport Command had a relatively high accident rate. Prominent accidents included a July 1943 crash at Gibraltar, killing the Polish leader General Sikorski and several other senior figures in the exile government; a February 1945 crash in the Mediterranean, killing eleven members of the British delegation to the Yalta Conference; and a March 1945 disappearance over the North Atlantic involving the aircraft formerly used as a private transport by Winston Churchill. 

Following these and other losses, in April 1945, concerns were raised in Parliament about the experience of crews and the maintenance of aircraft within Transport Command. One frequent issue reported was that VIP passengers were said to put pressure on crews to fly in difficult conditions; the Air Ministry reported that it had tried to put in place orders to prevent this.

Post war

As the Second World War ended, on 7 May 1945, No. 4 Group RAF was transferred into the command, from Bomber Command, but disbanded in early 1948; No. 44 Group disbanded by being amalgamated into No 46 Group on 14 August 1946; No. 48 Group RAF was established, but then disbanded on 15 May 1946; and No. 216 Group was transferred to RAF Mediterranean and Middle East. On 1 November 1949, No. 47 Group RAF disbanded by being renumbered 46 Group.

Overseas, two groups had been formed in India and Australia towards the end of the war. No. 232 Group RAF disbanded, now in Singapore on 15 August 1946, and 300 Group (24 April 1946 – 7 November 1946) in Sydney.

The Command took part in several big operations, including the Berlin Airlift in 1948, which reinforced the need for a large RAF transport fleet. The Handley Page Hastings, a four-engined transport, was introduced during the Berlin Airlift and continued as a mainstay transport aircraft of the RAF for the next 15 years. In 1956, new aircraft designs became available, including  the de Havilland Comet (the first operational jet transport), and the Blackburn Beverley. In 1959, the Bristol Britannia was introduced, with No. 99 Squadron RAF. No. 511 Squadron RAF was re-formed again at RAF Lyneham on 15 December 1959, as the second squadron to operate the Britannia on long-range trooping flights. 

During the 1960s the command was divided into three different forces:
 Strategic Force which operated the Comets, Britannias, VC-10s and Belfasts. Deliveries of the Vickers VC10 to No. 10 Squadron RAF began in December 1966 and ended in August 1968.
 Medium Range Force which operated Beverleys, Hastings and Argosys
 Short Range Force which operated helicopters such as the Bristol Belvedere, Westland Whirlwind and Westland Wessex and fixed wing aircraft such as Scottish Aviation Pioneers, Scottish Aviation Twin Pioneers and Hawker Siddeley Andovers.

During the 1950s and 1960s Transport Command evacuated military personnel from the Suez Canal Zone prior and after the Suez Crisis of October–November 1956; evacuated casualties from South Korea during the Korean War and from the Malaya during the Malayan Emergency; moved essential supplies to Woomera, South Australia, and ferried personnel and supplies out to Christmas Island for the UK's atomic bomb tests. In addition, Transport Command ran scheduled routes to military staging posts and bases in the Indian Ocean region, Southeast Asia and the Far East, to maintain contact between the UK and military bases of strategic importance. It also carried out special flights worldwide covering all the continents bar Antarctica. Many varied tasks were undertaken during the 1950s.

The 1960s saw a reduction of the RAF and a loss of independence of the former functional commands. Transport Command was renamed Air Support Command in 1967.

Other tasks in the 1950s 
Operation Becher's Brook was a major operation of Transport Command – the ferrying of 400 Canadair Sabre fighters from North America to the UK, circa 1952. This required pilots and ground crew to be transported to Canada. The Sabres were flown via Keflavik (Iceland) on to Shetland and from there to mainland Scotland.

Transport Command also supported the British North Greenland expedition a research expedition from 1952–54 on the Greenland ice.

Structure

Wings
During its existence the command supervised a number of wings:

Units 
Units included:
 The Airborne Forces Tactical Development Unit was formed at RAF Tarrant Rushton on 1 December 1943 and was disbanded on 14 January 1944 to become the Air Transport Tactical Development Unit. This new unit was then disbanded on 31 August 1945 at RAF Netheravon to become the Transport Command Development Unit. This unit was disbanded at RAF Abingdon on 28 February 1950 to become the Air Transport Development Flight, this new unit was disbanded on 14 October 1951 still at Abingdon to become the Transport Command Development Flight. This unit was disbanded on 8 February 1957 at RAF Benson.
 The Transport Command Aircrew Examining Unit was previously the Aircrew Testing and Grading Unit and was formed on 1 November 1945 at RAF Melbourne. It used a variety of transport aircraft until it was disbanded on 7 August 1946 at RAF Bramcote to become the Transport Command Examining Unit. This unit continued the work of the previous unit until it was disbanded on 23 June 1964 at RAF Benson, the unit then became the Transport Command Examining Staff until 1 August 1967 while still at RAF Benson became the Air Support Examining Unit
 Transport Command Air Support Flight was formed on 1 February 1953 at RAF Abingdon but was shortly disbanded on 14 September 1954 to become No. 1312 (Transport Support) Flight
 Transport Command Communication Flight was initially 'C' Flight of the Metropolitan Communication Squadron RAF and was separated doing May 1946 when it moved to RAF Upavon. At some point it became the Transport Command Communication Squadron and was disbanded on 1 April 1964 and was absorbed by the Western Communication Squadron RAF at RAF Upavon

Aircraft operated

Commanders-in-Chief 
Commanders-in-Chief included:

See also
List of aircraft of the Royal Air Force
Royal Air Force station
 List of Royal Air Force commands

References

Citations

Bibliography

 Kenneth Cross, "Transport Command Today," RUSI Journal, 1965 - aircraft types included Hastings, Beverleys, Argosys, Westland Wessex, Andovers, Hawker Hunter ground attack aircraft (under 38 Group), Britannias, Comets (under HQ Transport Command).

 M Milner, Review of Carl A. Christie, "Ocean Bridge: The History of RAF Ferry Command", The Canadian Historical Review, 1997
 Royal Air Force Historical Society Journal No 22
 
 Wilson, Keith. RAF Transport Command: A Pictorial History. Amberley Publishing Limited, 15/06/2017  
 Wynn, Humphrey. Forged in War: A History of Royal Air Force Transport Command, 1943–1967. London: Her Majesty's Stationery Office, 1996. .

External links

Military units and formations established in 1943
Transport Command
Transport units and formations of the Royal Air Force
Military units and formations of the Royal Air Force in World War II
Military units and formations disestablished in 1967
Air force transport commands